Mukarram in Lahore, Pakistan, often credited as Mukarram, is a Pakistani/Canadian actor currently living in Toronto, Ontario, Canada. He has worked in four movies and more than 200 TV shows.

Actor

References

External links
 
 https://web.archive.org/web/20110817071532/http://glamourinn.webs.com/

Living people
Pakistani male television actors
Pakistani emigrants to Canada
Naturalized citizens of Canada
Male actors from Lahore
Pakistani male film actors
Recipients of the Pride of Performance
Nigar Award winners
1970 births